Ari Väänänen (born 26 August 1947) is a Finnish former long jumper who competed in the 1972 Summer Olympics.

References

1947 births
Living people
Finnish male long jumpers
Olympic athletes of Finland
Athletes (track and field) at the 1972 Summer Olympics